Norris Winslow (1834, Watertown, Jefferson County, New York – May 10, 1900, Watertown, New York) was an American banker and politician from New York.

Life
He was the son of Assemblyman John Winslow (1802–1874) and Betsey (Collins) Winslow (1806–1843). He attended the common schools and Watertown Academy. Then he became a clerk in a dry-goods store. He married Julia B. Eddy (1837–1921).

In 1865, he opened the Merchants' Bank of Watertown, and after it was incorporated as a stock company in April 1870, became President of the bank. He was also President of the Watertown Fire Insurance Company, and held stock of the Davis Sewing Machine Company.

He was a member of the New York State Senate (18th D.) from 1870 to 1873, sitting in the 93rd, 94th, 95th and 96th New York State Legislatures.

Later he was for many years a special agent of the U.S. Treasury Department.

He was buried at the Brookside Cemetery in Watertown.

Sources
 The New York Civil List compiled by Franklin Benjamin Hough, Stephen C. Hutchins and Edgar Albert Werner (1870; pg. 444)
 Life Sketches of Executive Officers, and Members of the Legislature of the State of New York, Vol. III by H. H. Boone & Theodore P. Cook (1870; pg. 135f) [states birth in "May 1835"]
 Obituary Notes; Ex-New York State Senator MORRIS (sic) WINSLOW... in NYT on May 11, 1900

External links

1834 births
1900 deaths
Republican Party New York (state) state senators
Politicians from Watertown, New York
American bankers
19th-century American politicians
19th-century American businesspeople